Leslie Alexander Nemes (born 5 December 1960 in Croydon, England) is an English bassist. After being in several bands with guitarist/vocalist Nick Heyward, the pair formed Haircut One Hundred in 1980. The band enjoyed considerable success in the early 1980s including a top 5 album and four top 10 singles in the UK.

Although Heyward left Haircut One Hundred in early 1983, Nemes remained with the band for its second album, which was released in 1984. The album was a commercial failure and the band broke up.

Nemes then went on to tour and record as a session musician for Hugh Masekela, Chris Rea, Friends Again, China Crisis and Rick Astley.

Nemes moved to Spain in 2003.

Since 2004 after appearing on the VH1 show Bands Reunited, Haircut One Hundred (including both Nemes and Heyward) have reformed on several occasions.

References

1960 births
People from Croydon
Haircut One Hundred members
English rock bass guitarists
Male bass guitarists
Living people
English new wave musicians
English expatriates in Spain